Mount Pentelicus or Pentelikon (or ) is a mountain in Attica, Greece, situated northeast of Athens and southwest of Marathon. Its highest point is the peak Pyrgari,  with an elevation of 1,109 m. The mountain is covered in large part with forest (about 60 or 70%), and can be seen from southern Athens (Attica), the Pedia plain, Parnitha, and the southern part of the northern suburbs of Athens. Houses surround the mountain, especially in Vrilissia, Penteli, Ekali, Dionysos and north of Gerakas. Marble from Mount Pentelicus is of exceptionally high quality and was used to construct much of the Athenian Acropolis. Later, Pentelic marble  was exported to Rome, where it was used in construction and in sculptures.

In ancient times it was also called Brilissos or Brilittos which is the origin of the name of the nearby suburb of Vrilissia.

Mountain
Mount Pentelicus has been famous for its marble since antiquity. Pentelic marble was used for the construction of buildings in ancient Athens, particularly the Acropolis. The ancient quarry is protected by law, and used exclusively to obtain material for the Acropolis Restoration Project. The roadway used to transport marble blocks from the quarry to the Acropolis in antiquity is a continual downhill, and follows the natural lay of the land. It has been researched and fully documented by the chief Acropolis restoration architect, Professor Manolis Korres, in his award-winning book From Pentelicon to the Parthenon. A monastery is also located in the middle of the mountain, north-east of city center.

Pentelic marble 
Pentelic marble is white with a uniform, faint yellow tint, which makes it shine with a golden hue under sunlight. Pentelic marble is calcitic in composition with quartz as an accessory mineral. It is fine grained with sporadic calcitic fossil clasts. Pentelic marble is divided into 3 units distinguishable by δ13C and δ18O values. δ13C and δ18O values have been used to precisely match marbles from the Acropolis to their source quarries. The Elgin Marbles have been traced to Unit 3 using this method.

Fires
A fire in early July 1995 consumed much of the mountain forest, and the eastern half became residential districts of the Athens area. The volume of smoke was tremendous; it nearly covered the entire northeastern part of Athens, and all terrestrial televisual media covered the fire. The blaze lasted about five days; it reached east of Penteli about 5:30 p.m. local time, and then into the Pentelis and Vrilissia, consuming a group of houses on Friday night (about 9:00 p.m. EET, 7:00 p.m. UTC), the northern range on Saturday morning, Rhea on Saturday afternoon, Anoixi on Monday, and the Dionysus communities on Saturday. It consumed three quarters of the slopes of Mount Pentelicus, and was the worst forest fire Athens and Greece had seen in the 20th century. Housing development took place in the eastern half of the mountain which removed what was left of nature from the mountain, and streets are grid and circular.  Many are luxurious and several houses were later added; a mining area also removed what was left from nature in the eastern half.  The northern half remains heavily forested.

A series of fires also occurred after the major fire devastated the mountain range, from 1998 to 2001. Many of the fires were arson-related and suspects were arrested. After the major forest fire of July 1995, three years later in the area of Drafi, mudslides blocked roads as a rock clogged off a residential road; a series of mudslides also occurred several years later and devastated some homes, continuing in part to this day.

Yet again, twelve years after the major fire, flames once more encroached on the urban areas of Athens from June 30, 2007, the same day as the Parnitha fire, and a minor fire was seen northeast of Vrilissia, in which tens of houses and properties fell to the flames, along with its forests. The fire even burnt its dry grass which was the chief pattern of spread; the people of the area now favor removal of dry grass from future wildfires. The blaze burnt tens of hectares and lasted through the late afternoon to the late-night hours, and was seen as far as neighborhood streets and broader Athens. One and a half months later, a huge fire yet again battered the forests adjoining Penteli and Vrilissia. This time the wildfire was larger and more destructive, with flames towering as high as 50 to 60 m, and almost blocking any view of the sky, along with an attendant smoke. The blaze spread, burning tens or hundreds buildings, many of them  near the forested areas, and a western portion 10 km long from north to south, and 4 to 5 km wide from east to west. Firefighters along with the neighborhood's panicked residents battled the blaze on neighborhood streets, and helicopters sprayed the blaze. The fire had begun in the afternoon hours and quickly spread. One conflagration burnt trees in seconds, another extended to balconies with grills destroyed, and several roofs collapsed - the blaze lasted into the evening hours and its head burnt near the town, while Vrilissia, eastern Nea Erythraia, Ekali, and Dionyssos were also hit. Its cause, like most of the fires of 2007, was arson; a former firefighter was charged with fire-setting  and has been  sentenced and jailed. During the country's worst ever fire, which broke the 1950s record on August 26, 2007, flames sparked by arson  ravaged the forests of the remainder of the area around Mount Pentelicus and burnt pine, spruce and fir trees, lasting for several days; this was not the same blaze that had arrived from Keratea and Markopoulo to the south.

In July 2022 another wildfire destroyed several hectares of forest land.

See also
Aloula
List of mountains in Greece

References

Ancient Greece
Landforms of Attica
Pentelicus
Landforms of East Attica
Landforms of North Athens (regional unit)